Galam Cennalath (died 580) was a king of the Picts from 550 to 555.

The Pictish Chronicle king lists have him reign for between two and four years, with one year being jointly with Bridei son of Maelchon according to some versions. Some variants place his reign between Gartnait and Drest son of Girom which may be a copyist's error, or alternatively he may have had two reigns.

The death of "Cennalath, King of the Picts" is reported by the Annals of Ulster and the Annals of Tigernach for 580.

References
Anderson, Alan Orr, Early Sources of Scottish History A.D 500–1286, volume 1. Reprinted with corrections. Paul Watkins, Stamford, 1990.

External links
CELT: Corpus of Electronic Texts at University College Cork includes the Annals of Ulster, Tigernach, the Four Masters and Innisfallen, the Chronicon Scotorum, the Lebor Bretnach (which includes the Duan Albanach), Genealogies, and various Saints' Lives. Most are translated into English, or translations are in progress.
Pictish Chronicle 

6th-century births
580 deaths
Pictish monarchs
6th-century Scottish monarchs